Christopher Kas and Philipp Kohlschreiber were the defending champions, but they lost to František Čermák and Michal Mertiňák in the quarterfinals.Sergiy Stakhovsky and Mikhail Youzhny won the final 4–6, 7–5, [10–7] against Martin Damm and Filip Polášek.

Seeds

Draw

Draw

References
Main Draw

2010 Gerry Weber Open